Edward Francis Ryan (March 10, 1879 – November 3, 1956) was an American prelate of the Catholic Church. He served as bishop of the Diocese of Burlington in Vermont from 1945 until his death in 1956.

Biography

Early life 
Edward Ryan was born on March 10, 1879, in Lynn, Massachusetts, to Simon Joseph and Mary (née Breen) Ryan. After graduating from Ingalls Grammar School in Lynn, he attended Lynn Classical High School and Boston College in Boston. He furthered his studies at the Pontifical North American College in Rome.

Priesthood 
Ryan was ordained to the priesthood in Rome for the Archdiocese of Boston by Archbishop Giuseppe Ceppetelli on August 10, 1905. He then did pastoral work in the archdiocese and served as a chaplain during World War I in the United States Army from 1919 to 1920.

Bishop of Burlington 
On November 11, 1944, Ryan was appointed the fifth bishop of the Diocese of Burlington by Pope Pius XII. He received his episcopal consecration on January 3, 1945, from Archbishop Richard Cushing, with Archbishop Francis Spellman and Bishop Francis Keough serving as co-consecrators. He was installed at the Cathedral of the Immaculate Conception in Burlington on February 7, 1945. 

During his 11-year-long tenure, Ryan established the first Carthusian monastery in the United States in Whitingham, Vermont in 1951.  He also established the Benedictine Priory at Weston, Vermont in 1953, and the College of St. Joseph at Rutland, Vermont, in 1954. He erected almost two dozen new churches, established the Vermont Catholic Tribune in 1956, and provided a camp and a school for boys in Burlington.

Edward Ryan died in Burlington on November 3, 1956, at age 77. He is buried at Resurrection Park in South Burlington, Vermont.

References

1879 births
1956 deaths
Boston College alumni
People from Lynn, Massachusetts
Roman Catholic Archdiocese of Boston
Roman Catholic bishops of Burlington
20th-century Roman Catholic bishops in the United States
United States Army chaplains
Burials in Vermont
Religious leaders from Massachusetts
Catholics from Massachusetts
Military personnel from Massachusetts